Ismael Ahmed (Arabic:إسماعيل أحمد) (born 29 December 1989) is an Emirati footballer who plays as a defender.

Career
Ismael Ahmed started his career at Dubai and is a product of the Dubai's youth system. and then he played with Al-Shaab.

Ajman
On 11 January 2018 signed with Ajman. On 21 April 2018, Ismail Ahmed made his professional debut for Ajman against Al-Wahda in the Pro League.

External links

References

1989 births
Living people
Emirati footballers
Emirati people of Baloch descent
Dubai CSC players
Al-Shaab CSC players
Ajman Club players
UAE Pro League players
UAE First Division League players
Association football defenders
Place of birth missing (living people)